Download Series Volume 2 is a live album by the rock band the Grateful Dead. It was released as a digital download on June 7, 2005. The show is a one-disc set of a previously uncirculated concert at Springer's Ballroom in Gresham, Oregon (though listed as Springer's Inn in Portland, Oregon), from January 18, 1970.

Volume 2 was mastered in HDCD from the original 2-track master tapes by Jeffrey Norman.

Critical reception

On AllMusic, Jesse Jarnow said, "Only one tune from [Workingman's Dead or American Beauty] gets played here... though they also charge through a six-minute take of the new (and rare) "Mason's Children".... The highlight is unquestionably a 13-plus minute version of Martha & the Vandellas' "Dancing in the Street". Garcia, Bob Weir, and Phil Lesh's harmonies are big and enthused, the San Francisco ballroom scene encapsulated in one vocal arrangement. The jam makes its way into deeply spaced jazz, Garcia especially wearing his John Coltrane love... on his sleeve."

Track listing
"Cold Rain and Snow" (trad., arr. Grateful Dead) - 6:10
"Big Boss Man" (Luther Dixon, Al Smith) - 4:48
"Mason's Children" (Robert Hunter, Jerry Garcia, Phil Lesh, Bob Weir) - 5:53
"Black Peter" (Hunter, Garcia) - 10:44
"Dancing In The Street" (Marvin Gaye, Ivy Hunter, William Stevenson) - 14:04
"Good Lovin'" (Rudy Clark, Artie Resnick) - 10:17
"China Cat Sunflower" > (Hunter, Garcia) - 4:36
"I Know You Rider" (trad., arr. Grateful Dead) - 5:08
"Turn On Your Lovelight" (Deadric Malone, Joseph Scott) - 18:07

Personnel

Grateful Dead
Jerry Garcia – lead guitar, vocals
Ron "Pigpen" McKernan – vocals, percussion
Tom Constanten – keyboards
Mickey Hart – drums
Bill Kreutzmann – drums
Phil Lesh – electric bass
Bob Weir – rhythm guitar, vocals

Production
Bear – recording
Jeffrey Norman – mastering

References

02
2005 live albums